Alt Urgell is a comarca (county) in Catalonia, Spain, a modern representation of part of the historic County of Urgell (ca 789 - 1413), seat of the Counts of Urgell and the historic region of Urgellet.

Municipalities

References

External links 
 
Palau Robert unofficial Alt Urgell page, in Catalan
Diputació de Lleida official page about Alt Urgell, in Catalan

 
Comarques of the Province of Lleida
Pyrenees